Gračanica or Graçanicë, is a town and municipality located in Pristina District in central Kosovo. As of 2011, it has an estimated population of 10,675 inhabitants, though most Serbs boycotted the Kosovo government's attempt at conducting a census.

It is centered around the Gračanica Monastery, ten kilometers east of Pristina. The 1999 Kosovo War and its aftermath transformed Gračanica from a sleepy village into an administrative center serving the needs of the 75,000 Kosovo Serbs living south of the Ibar River. After the 2013 Brussels Agreement, the municipality was supposed to become part of the Community of Serb Municipalities, however this still hasn't been implemented yet despite the promises from the Prishtina government.

History
Pope Benedict IX mentioned the village as Grazaniza in a letter from 1303. It was mentioned in King Stefan Milutin's founding charter of the Gračanica Monastery (1321). In the 15th century the settlement was a notable commercial centre. Until the 17th century it had a notable Ragusan community. It seems that the settlement was abandoned in 1689 during the Austrian penetration into Kosovo in the Great Turkish War. In 1901, it had 60 houses, all Serb, with 400 inhabitants.

2000–present
On 6 June 2000, a grenade was thrown at a crowd of ethnic Serbs waiting for a bus in the town square, injuring three people, which was followed by some civil unrest. On 15 March 2004 a Serb teenager was killed in a drive-by shooting in the village of Čaglavica (partly in Gračanica). This event led to the 2004 unrest in Kosovo. In the aftermath of the unrest, another Serb teenager Dimitrije Popović was killed in a drive-by shooting by Albanians on June 5, 2004.

Magistral road between Pristina and Gjilan passing through Gračanica proved to be a very dangerous place for Serbs, although such killings by Albanians do not exist today, fear and mistrust of Serbs towards Albanians has not completely disappeared, because sometimes there is a provocation of Albanians passing by cars. In 2016, an attempt was made to kidnap a Serbian girl.

After the 2008 Kosovo declaration of independence, the municipality of Gračanica was established in 2008 by the Government of the Republic of Kosovo, out of parts of the municipalities of Lipljan, Kosovo Polje and Pristina. Although the new municipality is primarily inhabited by Serbs, this move was not recognized by the Government of Serbia, which does not recognize the Republic of Kosovo, and therefore its administrative changes.

After the 2013 Brussels Agreement between the governments of Kosovo and Serbia, Serbia recognized the municipalities and Kosovo's governance of the territory, and agreed to create a Community of Serb Municipalities, which will operate within the Kosovo legal framework.

Politics
The first municipal elections were held on 15 November 2009. The government of Serbia asked Serbs not to participate in the elections which it does not recognize, but many of them did. Serb Bojan Stojanović was elected Mayor.

Town of Gračanica is also temporary seat of the administration of Serbia-recognized City of Pristina. The Serbia-sponsored local elections were held on 11 May 2008. Those elections were boycotted by the Albanians who consider Kosovo independent from Serbia, so only Serbs participated.

Settlements
Aside from the town of Gračanica, the municipality has the following villages:

 Badovac
 Batuše
 Čaglavica (part)
 Dobrotin
 Donja Gušterica
 Gornja Gušterica
 Laplje Selo
 Lepina
 Livade
 Preoce
 Skulanevo
 Sušica
 Suvi Do
 Radevo
 Ugljare

Demographics

The municipality of Gračanica has 10,675 inhabitants, according to the 2011 census results. Based on the population estimates from the Kosovo Agency of Statistics in 2016, the municipality has 11,931 inhabitants. Many of the inhabitants are Serb refugees driven out of Pristina. Differing estimates exist for the enclave as a whole, ranging from 10,500 to 13,000 inhabitants in the 15 villages that make up the enclave. The enclave has a roughly ten-kilometer radius in which Serbs enjoy freedom of movement and attempt to organize a meaningful life for themselves.

Ethnic groups
The ethnic composition of the municipality of Gračanica:

Geography and infrastructure
The settlement is situated in the spacious valley of the Gračanka river, by the river, on the exit of the gorge between the hill of Veletina (874m) and sloping hill of Glasnovik on the south, and hill of Steževac (794m) on the northeast.

Infrastructure

Gračanica has been a Serb enclave since the end of the 1999 Kosovo War, and is the largest and most secure Serbian enclave in central Kosovo. It runs along the Skopje-Pristina road, and unites several neighboring Serbian villages. The enclave, which contains rich farmland and is strategically located in the center of Kosovo, on major roads and near Pristina, has been seen as a potential threat by some Albanian nationalists, who view it as "a den of Serbian intrigue".

Gračanica has an elementary school, several small stores, an open-air market and a police station that employs ethnic Albanians and international police officers, who notably do not speak the Serbian language. The health care center is located in the central part of the town, next to the UNMIK headquarters. An elementary school was reconstructed after the 1999 war. In December 2008, the Serbian government built a €90,000 post office in Gračanica and promised further investments.

Annotations

See also
 Municipalities of Kosovo
 Cities and towns in Kosovo
 Community of Serb Municipalities

References

Sources

External links 

 
 Municipality of Gračanica 
 Municipality of Gračanica (Republic of Kosovo)

 
Serbian enclaves in Kosovo
Municipalities of Kosovo
Medieval Serbian sites in Kosovo